Shakheh-ye Pain may refer to:
 Shakheh-ye Pain, Andimeshk
 Shakheh-ye Pain, alternate name of Shakheh-ye Albu Shahbaz, Shadegan County
 Shakheh-ye Pain, alternate name of Shakheh-ye Sofla, Shadegan County